Kobbvika is a village in Narvik Municipality in Nordland county, Norway. Efjord Chapel is located in this village.

References

Ballangen
Villages in Nordland
Populated places of Arctic Norway